The Summerville Formation is a geological formation in New Mexico, Colorado, and Utah of the Southwestern United States. It dates back to the Oxfordian stage of the Late Jurassic.

Description
The lower portion of the formation shows polygonal desiccation cracks and localized salt-hopper casts while the upper portion contains considerable gypsum, consistent with deposition in a sabkha on the margin of the Sundance Sea.It is exposed in the San Rafael Reef, the Waterpocket Fold, in the Henry Mountains, with additional exposures scattered across the region from the San Rafael Reef to the Paradox Basin, and in north-central New Mexico. The thin bedding is characteristic throughout the formation, but gypsum is not found in the San Juan Basin and some conglomerate is found on the south and southwestern margins of the formation. The correlation of late Jurassic beds in northwestern New Mexico with the Summerville Formation in Utah has been questioned, and it has been suggested that they be assigned to the Beclabito Formation instead.

The Summerville Formation rests conformably on the underlying Curtis Formation (Utah and western Colorado) or Todilto Formation (southwest Colorado and New Mexico) but is separated from the overlying Morrison Formation by the regional J5 unconformity. It thins significantly in the Moab-La Sal area, the likely area of the divide between the marine Curtis basin to the northwest and the salina lake Todilto basin to the southeast. In many locations the Summerville is separated from the Morrison by eolian sandstones, such as the Bluff Sandstone, variously assigned to the Morrison Formation or the San Rafael Group. The Morrison Formation represents a return to more humid conditions with increased clastic input.

The Bell Ranch Formation of northeastern New Mexico is correlative with the Summerville Formation.

The Summerville Formation is interpreted as recording a regression of the Sundance Sea to the north, with simultaneous infilling of both the Curtis and Todilto basins. This produced a depositional environment of very low relief, in which occasional encroachments of eolian sand during times of drought were subsequently worked into thin strata by wave action in ephemeral saline lakes.

Fossil content 
The formation is almost completely lacking in body fossils. However, theropod tracks were found in the formation in Utah, New Mexico, and Colorado.

Avemetatarsalians

History of investigation

The formation was first defined in 1928 for exposures in the San Rafael Reef. Similar beds in northeastern Arizona and the San Juan Basin are assigned to the Wanakah Formation, but continue to be assigned to the Summerville Formation in north-central New Mexico.

See also 

 List of dinosaur-bearing rock formations
 Geologic formations of the United States

Footnotes

References
 
 
 
 Lockley, M.; Harris, J.D.; and Mitchell, L. 2008. "A global overview of pterosaur ichnology: tracksite distribution in space and time." Zitteliana. B28. p. 187-198. .
 
 
 Weishampel, David B; et al. (2004). "Dinosaur distribution (Middle Jurassic, North America)." In: Weishampel, David B.; Dodson, Peter; and Osmólska, Halszka (eds.): The Dinosauria, 2nd, Berkeley: University of California Press. Pp. 537–538. .

Geologic formations of Arizona
Geologic formations of Oklahoma
Geologic formations of Colorado
Geologic formations of Utah
Oxfordian Stage
Jurassic Arizona
Jurassic formations of New Mexico
Jurassic geology of Oklahoma
Jurassic Colorado
Jurassic geology of Utah
Mudstone formations
Sandstone formations of the United States
Ichnofossiliferous formations
Paleontology in Arizona
Paleontology in New Mexico
Jurassic System of North America